Fleur de Lys centre commercial (formerly and still commonly called Place Fleur de Lys) is a shopping mall located in the Vanier borough of Quebec City, Quebec, Canada, managed by Trudel Immeubles since July 2018, and was last renovated in 2004. It is located across from L'Institut de réadaptation en déficience physique de Québec and close to the Videotron Centre.

With its 150 stores, Fleur de Lys centre commercial is located in an urban area near various development projects.
It is anchored by Walmart and Maxi.

History
Place Fleur de Lys opened on March 21, 1963 with anchors Simpsons-Sears (Sears), Steinberg and Zellers. Place Fleurs de Lys is notable for having the first ever Sears department store in the province of Quebec.

On October 17, 1968, S.S. Kresge Co Ltée  opened a Kmart store. As with Sears five years earlier, the Kmart at Place Fleurs de Lys was the first in the province.

In March 1980,  Place Fleur de Lys expanded from 650 000 square feet to 850 000 to reach 170 stores including a new Pascal hardware store. After Pascal closed, its former space of 75 000 square feet was converted into another mall expansion of 145 000 square feet anchored by a single level The Bay store which opened on October 7, 1992.

Steinberg went bankrupt and its store at Fleur de Lys was not converted into another supermarket. It was instead replaced on May 5, 1993 by Club Biz, an office supply retailer founded by former executives of the Steinberg supermarket chain, which operated until 1996. Club Biz at Place Fleur de Lys was the chain's only store located outside the Montreal area.

Kmart closed on May 31, 1995 and the Zellers in the mall relocated in its space. Zellers at Fleur de Lys was the last remaining store of the chain in Quebec City by the time  it closed on March 14, 2013. Target had acquired the lease of Zellers and opened a store at Fleur de Lys on October 18, 2013 as part of the retailer's second wave of openings in Quebec. In 2015, Walmart bought the lease of the former Target store.

Sears lasted until the end of the chain on January 14, 2018. The departure of Sears came four months after the mall had lost another department store, The Bay, which closed on September 23, 2017.

Access
The mall is access by Quebec Autoroute 973 and Quebec Route 138 via boulevard Wilfrid-Hamel.

Réseau de transport de la Capitale has a number of regular bus routes serving the mall.

See also
List of largest enclosed shopping malls in Canada

Other malls in Quebec City area:

Galeries de la Capitale
Laurier Québec
Place Sainte-Foy

References

External links

Shopping malls in Quebec City
Shopping malls established in 1963
1963 establishments in Quebec